Margaret Kerry (née Lynch; born May 11, 1929) is an American screen actress, dancer, voice artist, camera double, radio producer, director and host and media personality, best known for her work as a model for Walt Disney Pictures, where she served as the inspiration and pantomimed the Peter Pan character of Tinker Bell.

Early life

Born as Peggy Lynch, in Springfield, Illinois, she was adopted at three years old and moved to Los Angeles. Her first role, at age 4, was as a fairy in the 1935 film A Midsummer Night's Dream directed by Max Reinhardt.  She worked under her real name as a dancer and actor in three of the Our Gang comedy shorts.

Kerry served as a camera double for Elizabeth Taylor in film National Velvet at MGM. She attracted the attention of Eddie Cantor, who cast her in the role of his teenage daughter in the film If You Knew Susie. Cantor thought Lynch needed a more theatrical-sounding name to be more noticeable as an actor, so she officially became Margaret Kerry.  She graduated from high school with honors while working on the film and would later graduate cum laude from Los Angeles City College.

Career

Television work/voice artistry
Kerry as a teenager played the role of "Sharon" in the first network sitcoms, The Ruggles, on ABC-TV. The show's farewell episode at the end of its three-year run featured Sharon's wedding and honeymoon. Kerry also appeared in two episodes of The Andy Griffith Show, and a 1950 episode of The Lone Ranger. A voiceover performer with twenty-one dialects and forty-eight character voices, Kerry provided voices on 52 episodes of the groundbreaking children's television show, Clutch Cargo, including characters "Paddlefoot" and "Spinner". She provided numerous voices and live-action lead-ins for The New Three Stooges and Space Angel animated series for Cambria Productions.

Work with Disney

Kerry answered an audition call during the planning stages of the animated feature film Peter Pan. The audition, supervised by animator Marc Davis, required her to pantomime the motions that would be used as live-action reference for the animation of Tinker Bell. As Tinker Bell was to be non verbal, her movements would be integral, and Davis sought a dancer that could help embody the character. Kerry won the part and spent six months at the Disney Studios on a mostly empty sound stage pantomiming the part. The studios provided props, notably a giant keyhole mounted on a stand as well as a pair of giant scissors, used in the scene where Tinker Bell became trapped in a jewelry box. Kerry also provided the voice and reference movements of the red-haired mermaid in the Neverland lagoon scene.

Radio
Kerry was a producer, writer and host of What's Up Weekly - Ministry Loves Company on KKLA-FM, Los Angeles, from 1992 and 2004, a Christian radio station. Also serving as the station's community services director, she headed an outreach program that connected to more than 200 non-profit service agencies. 
Kerry is a certified seminar leader by the American Seminar Leaders Association and co-author and facilitator of the FUNdamentals of Speaking Seminars. She continues to meet fans and attends many conventions, events and seminars throughout the country. As a supporter and contributor within the animation community, Kerry served as a board member of ASIFA-Hollywood for a number of years.

Books

Kerry published her autobiography in 2016 Tinker Bell Talks: Tales of a Pixie Dusted Life with stories and anecdotes from her life and career, and featuring 180 photos and pieces of art. In 2019, Kerry self-published a booklet They All Look Alike To Me with short stories detailing her having prosopagnosia, also known as "face blindness".

Personal life

Kerry reconnected after 70 years with former boyfriend, WWII veteran Robert Boeke, age 94. The two were married on Valentine's Day, February 14, 2020 in a ceremony at the Little Brown Church in the Valley in Studio City, California. Kerry suffers from prosopagnosia and has spoken and written about coping with it.

Awards and honors

On the occasion of her 90th birthday, Kerry was honored with certificates by Los Angeles Mayor Eric Garcetti on behalf of the City of Los Angeles; the Los Angeles City Council; and the Los Angeles County Board of Supervisors via 5th District Supervisor Kathryn Barger. Kerry also received a card from the First Lady of the United States, Melania Trump, who noted Kerry's life as "an important part of the American story and the history of Cinema and Entertainment." On February 15, 2020, Kerry was honored with the Disneyana Fan Club Legends award. On February 16, 2020, Kerry was presented with the Ward Kimball award by the board of Walt Disney's Carolwood Barn.

Partial filmography

References

External links

 
 TinkerBellTalks.com - The Official Margaret Kerry Website

1929 births
Living people
20th-century American actresses
Actresses from Los Angeles
Walt Disney Animation Studios people
American child actresses
American film actresses
American voice actresses
Los Angeles City College alumni
Our Gang